Mesitornis is a genus of birds in the family Mesitornithidae. Its two members. the white-breasted mesite and the brown mesite are endemic to Madagascar and both species are classified as vulnerable on the International Union for Conservation of Nature (IUCN) Red list of Threatened species. A third species is also called a mesite, (the subdesert mesite) is the single member of the genus Monias.

Species

Mesitornis
There are two species, the  brown mesite (Mesitornis unicolor) and the  white-breasted mesite (Mesitornis variegatus). They are  medium-sized birds to  respectively and are considered to look like the rails; a family (Rallidae) in which the mesites are sometimes placed. Both species are ground-nesting and move slowly amongst the undergrowth searching in the leaf litter for invertebrates.

The brown mesite is secretive and rarely seen, they live in undisturbed primary, evergreen, humid forest along the eastern coast of Madagascar, from Marojejy National Park in the north to Tôlanaro to the south. Their dark plumage provides camouflage amongst the leaf-litter, in the shady undergrowth.

The white-breasted mesite lives in small groups of two to four, usually an adult breeding pair and recent young. It is found in dry deciduous forest, within five sites in the north and west of Madagascar and one site in the east.

References

 
Bird genera
 
Taxa named by Charles Lucien Bonaparte